Bulgaria is scheduled to compete at the 2024 Summer Olympics in Paris from 26 July to 11 August 2024.  Bulgarian athletes have appeared in every edition of the Summer Olympics from 1924 onwards, except for three occasions: the 1948 Summer Olympics in London because of the nation's instigation in World War II, and the 1932 and 1984 Summer Olympics in Los Angeles because of the worldwide Great Depression and Soviet boycott, respectively.

Competitors
The following is the list of number of competitors in the Games.

Gymnastics

Rhythmic
Bulgaria entered a squad of rhythmic gymnasts to compete each in the individual and group all-around competition, following the nation's successful top-three finish in the qualifying round at the 2022 World Championships in Sofia.

Shooting

Bulgarian shooters achieved quota places for the following events based on their results at the 2022 and 2023 ISSF World Championships, 2022, 2023, and 2024 European Championships, 2023 European Games, and 2024 ISSF World Olympic Qualification Tournament, if they obtained a minimum qualifying score (MQS) from 14 August 2022 to 9 June 2024.

References

Nations at the 2024 Summer Olympics
2024
2024 in Bulgarian sport